Guatemala competed at the 1968 Summer Olympics in Mexico City, Mexico.  It had been 16 years since the previous time that the nation competed at the Olympic Games. 48 competitors, 47 men and 1 woman, took part in 37 events in 8 sports.

Athletics

Men
Track & road events

Field events

Boxing

Men

Cycling

Four cyclists represented Guatemala in 1968.

Road

Football

First round

Group D

Quarter-finals

Shooting

Nine shooters, all men, represented Guatemala in 1968.
Open

Swimming

Men

Women

Weightlifting

Men

Wrestling

Men's freestyle

Men's Greco-Roman

References

External links
Official Olympic Reports

Nations at the 1968 Summer Olympics
1968
1968 in Guatemalan sport